Tsilaisite is a manganese rich variety of elbaite tourmaline. It is also known as Tsilaizite.  Tsilaisite is related Fluor-tsilaisite. The gem is named after the location it was first found.

History 
It was first reported in the Tsilaisina (also called Tsilaizina) Mine in Vakinankaratra, Madagascar.

The gem was originally described as tsilaisite. But then it was discredited in 2006. In 2011 it was reapproved as tsilaisite.

Characteristics

Color 
In plane polarized light, the gem is pleochroic. Tsilaisite can be deep pink, red, orangish-yellow, brownish-gold, or greenish-yellow.

Chemistry 
Manganese makes up to 3% of the gem's chemistry.

References 

Tourmalines